Lake Placid is a town in Highlands County, Florida, United States. As of the 2010 census the population was 2,223 and in 2018 the estimated population was 2,439. It is part of the Sebring Metropolitan Statistical Area.

The town has two nicknames: "Town of Murals" and "The Caladium Capital of the World". Lake Placid has 47 murals painted on buildings throughout the town, and 98 percent of the world's caladium bulbs come from Lake Placid. There are 14 caladium farms, spanning 1,200 acres, and these plants have been grown in the area since the 1940s. In 2013, Reader's Digest named Lake Placid America's Most Interesting Town.

However, government sources exclude a 270-foot height, allowing only a 240-foot height.



History

Lake Placid, which was formerly called "Lake Stearns", was chartered on December 1, 1925. Dr. Melvil Dewey, the inventor of the Dewey Decimal System, and the founder of the Lake Placid Club in Lake Placid, New York, proposed that Lake Stearns change its name to "Lake Placid". On April 29, 1927, the Lake Stearns Commissioners accepted Dr. Dewey's proposal. Subsequently, they submitted a request to the Florida State Legislature. On June 6, 1927, the community was chartered as the town of Lake Placid.

Geography

Lake Placid is located in central Highlands County at  (27.29525, –81.37263). U.S. Route 27 passes through the town, leading north  to Sebring, the county seat, and south  to Clewiston.

Demographics

As of the census of 2010, there were 2,223 people, 841 households, 490 family households, and 1,040 housing units in the town.

The racial makeup of the town was 69.6% White, 7.1% Black and African American, 0.4% American Indian and Alaska Native, 1.2% Asian, 0.1% Native Hawaiian or Other Pacific Islander, 18.9% Some Other Race, and 2.7% from Two or More Races. Hispanic or Latino of any race were 46.1% of the population.

There were 841 households, of which 58.3% were family households – with one or more people related to the householder or related to one of a same-sex couple by birth, marriage or adoption; and 41.7% were nonfamily households – including same-sex couples with no other relatives. Family households included 29.0% with their own children under 18 years, 37.0% were a husband-wife family, 6.4% were a male householder with no wife present, 14.9% were a female householder with no husband present. Nonfamily households consisted of 12.2% males living alone – 5.8% 65 years and older – and 19.7% females living alone – 19.7% 65 years and older. The average household size was 2.63 and the average family size was 3.21. The median age of the population was 34.4 years.

From the 2016 American Community Survey, the population was spread out, with 10% under 5 years old, 15.3% from 5 to 14, 45.2% from 15 to 44, 20.9% from 45 to 64, and 16.1% who were 65 years of age or older (significant margins of error causes total to exceed 100%). The sex ratio was 106.3 males per 100 females. The educational attainment of the population who were a high school graduate or higher was 59.2%, while 12.3% had a bachelor's degree or higher. The poverty rate of the population 25 years and older was 61.0% if less than a high school graduate, 52.2% if a high school graduate, 26.8% with some college, and 13.4% with a bachelor's degree or higher. The median earnings of the population 25 years and over during the past 12 months was $14,938, consisting of $10,625 if less than a high school graduate, $15,187 if a high school graduate, $18,988 with some college, and $147,961 with a bachelor's degree. The per capita income was $17,318. 54.7% of all people had incomes below the poverty level. All figures from the survey had significant margins of error.

Media

Television

Lake Placid is located in a fringe viewing area; its television stations originate in distant cities. Local television services offer signals from WFTV, the ABC affiliate in Orlando, WINK, the CBS affiliate in Fort Myers/Naples, WFLA, the Tampa Bay area NBC affiliate, and WTVT, the Tampa Bay area Fox affiliate. There are no TV stations whose studios or broadcasting towers are located in Lake Placid.

Radio

Lake Placid is part of the Sebring radio market, which is ranked as the 288th largest in the United States by Arbitron. It is the city of license for WWTK 730 kHz and is in that station's primary coverage area, however, there are no radio stations whose studios or broadcasting towers are located in Lake Placid.

Newspapers

The Highlands News-Sun, a Sebring-based newspaper published daily, is currently the only commercial newspaper circulating in Lake Placid. The Journal, a locally based weekly publication, had circulated for almost 60 years in Lake Placid, but ceased publication.

=Notable people

Points of interest

Lake Placid Tower

The structure, built by Ridge Builders, and previously called the Happiness Tower, is a closed concrete block observation tower located on US Highway 27. It was designed by architect A. Wynn Howell of Lakeland, built in 1960, and opened January 1, 1961. It was the tallest concrete block structure in the world when it opened.

For years, the tower was open to tourists who could take a 65 second elevator ride to the observation deck. Because of sluggish sales, the tower closed in 2003 and is now a cell phone tower.

Historical Society Depot Museum

The Old Lake Placid Atlantic Coast Line Railroad Depot, now the Historical Society Depot Museum of the Lake Placid Historical Society, is a historic Atlantic Coast Line Railroad depot in Lake Placid, Florida. It is located at 12 East Park Street and is listed on the National Register of Historic Places.

Wall murals 

There are 47 large murals on the sides of buildings in Lake Placid's "uptown" area. These have become a tourist attraction. The Welcome Center sells a booklet with a map of the murals that provides specifics about the history that each one depicts, as well as information about the artist(s).

The murals were planned in 1992 by Harriet and Bob Porter and were painted in subsequent years by various artists, most depicting the history of the area. Some feature the trompe-l'œil technique.

Toby’s American Clown Museum and School 

Lake Placid is home to the American Clown Museum and School, which was founded in 1993. Here more than 700 significant pieces of clown memorabilia can be found.

Sister cities 

 Lake Placid, New York, United States of America
 Lompoc, California, United States of America

References

External links

 Town of Lake Placid Official Website
 Lake Placid Chamber of Commerce
 Lake Placid High School
Lake Placid Memorial Library
 Highlands News-Sun

Towns in Highlands County, Florida
Populated places established in 1925
Towns in Florida
1925 establishments in Florida